Connecticut's 51st House of Representatives district elects one member of the Connecticut House of Representatives. It consists of the towns of Putnam, Thompson, and parts of Killingly. It has been represented by Republican Rick Hayes since 2019.

Recent elections

2020

2018

2016

2014

2012

References

51